Teemu Kankkunen (born 13 January 1980) is a retired Finnish footballer and who most recently was the head coach of HIFK.

Career
He plays central defender. Height: 6'2" (188 cm) former clubs: Atlantis FC, FC Viikingit, AC Vantaa, TiPS, in December 2008 retired from professional football and is currently assistant coach of HIFK Helsinki.

Coaching career
Kankkunen was in the 2009 season Youth Head Coach by Atlantis FC.
2010 and 2011: Assistant Coach of HIFK's 1st team.

Honours
Won Finnish Champion in A-junior level (1999, AC Vantaa)

External links
 Player Profile
 Profile
 

1980 births
Living people
Finnish footballers
Atlantis FC players
Association football central defenders
Footballers from Helsinki
21st-century Finnish people